"The Masque of the Red Death" is an 1842 short story by Edgar Allan Poe.

The Masque of the Red Death may also refer to:

The Masque of the Red Death (1964 film), a 1964 film adapted from the short story by Poe, directed by Roger Corman
Masque of the Red Death (1989 film), a remake of Corman's 1964 film, directed by Larry Brand and produced by Roger Corman
Masque of the Red Death (1989 Alan Birkinshaw film), a slasher movie directed by Alan Birkinshaw
Masque of the Red Death (album), a 1988 anthology album by Diamanda Galás
The Masque of the Red Death (play), a 2007 promenade performance play
Masque of the Red Death (Ravenloft), a Dungeons & Dragons campaign setting

See also
The Red Death, an American band